Qasemabad Rural District is a rural district (dehestan) in the Central District of Rafsanjan County, Kerman Province, Iran. At the 2006 census, its population was 17,430, in 4,255 families. The rural district has 18 villages.

References 

Rural Districts of Kerman Province
Rafsanjan County